The 19th Expeditionary Weather Squadron is an inactive unit of the United States Air Force.  It last performed weather related duties as part of the International Security Assistance Force in Afghanistan from 2009 to 2014.  It was assigned to the 504th Expeditionary Air Support Operations Group.  The squadron was first active during World War II where it served in Africa.  Following the end of the war, it was stripped of personnel and equipment, but remained on the active roll until 1947.  The squadron was reactivated in 1948 and provided weather services from various bases in the midwestern United States until inactivating in 1961 .

History

World War II
The squadron was first organized at Bolling Field, District of Columbia at the end of June 1942.  After organizing and training in the United States, it departed for the Mediterranean Theater of Operations in September, arriving in Egypt in November.  Squadron headquarters was located on the Horn of Africa, at Gura, Eritrea by December, but relocated to Accra, Gold Coast (now Ghana) by the spring of 1943, and remained there for the rest of the war.  The squadron operated through detachments located throughout northern Africa and, after 1943, in Italy.  The squadron supported special operations in the Mediterranean.  By May 1944, it had seven detachments operating behind German lines in the Balkans, primarily in Albania and Yugoslavia. In March, two squadron weather observers and a radioman had parachuted into Yugoslavia and were embedded with Tito's partisan forces to provide information for Douglas C-47 Skytrains airlifting supplies for the partisans.

In the spring of 1946 the squadron left Accra, and in June 1946, moved without personnel to Wiesbaden, Germany.  It remained there as a paper unit until inactivating in October 1947.

Cold War
The squadron was again activated on 1 June 1948 at Smoky Hill Air Force Base, Kansas.  It moved twice in the next three years before arriving at Kansas City, Missouri in September 1951, providing regional weather coverage for USAF units.  From Kansas City, and later, from Grandview Air Force Base (later Richards-Gebaur Air Force Base, its detachments provided weather services for the bases of Central Air Defense Force (CADF) and the squadron commander acted as the staff weather officer for CADF.  After CADF was inactivated, it provided the same services for 33d Air Division bases.  It was inactivated on 8 July 61 and its personnel and equipment transferred to the 29th Weather Squadron, which moved on paper from Malmstrom Air Force Base to Richards-Gebaur.

Global War on Terror
The squadron was redesignated the 19th Expeditionary Weather Squadron and converted to provisional status.  It was assigned to Air Combat Command (ACC) to activate or inactivate as needed.  By October, ACC had organized the squadron at and assigned it to the 504th Expeditionary Air Support Operations Group at Bagram Air Field to perform weather observation and forecasting duties as part of the International Security Assistance Force in Afghanistan from 2009 to 2014.  The squadron primarily provided support to Army task forces operating throughout Afghanistan.

Lineage
 Constituted as the 19th Weather Squadron, Regional on 13 June 1942
 Activated on 30 June 1942
 Inactivated on 3 October 1947
 Redesignated 19th Weather Squadron
 Activated on 1 June 1948
 Inactivated on 8 July 1961
 Redesignated 19th Expeditionary Weather Squadron and converted to provisional status, on 12 February 2009
 Activated by 2 October 2009
 Inactivated c. 10 November 2014

Assignments
 Air Weather Service, 30 June 1942
 United States Army in the Middle East, 31 October 1943
 Army Air Forces Weather Service, 19 July 1945
 5th Weather Group, 2 August 1946 – 3 October 1947
 103 Weather Group (later 2103d Air Weather Group), 1 June 1948
 2059th Air Weather Wing, 24 October 1950
 2103d Air Weather Group, 16 September 1951
 3d Weather Group, 20 April 1952
 4th Weather Wing, 8 August 1959 – 8 July 1961
 Air Combat Command to activate or inactivate at any time on or after 12 February 2009 
 504th Expeditionary Air Support Operations Group, by 2 October 2009 - c. 10 November 2014

Stations
 Bolling Field, District of Columbia, 30 June–24 September 1942
 Suez, Egypt, 11 November 1942
 Fayid, Egypt, 14 November 1942
 Gura, Eritrea, 19 December 1942
 Accra, Gold Coast, 21 April 1943
 Cazes Air Base, French Morocco, c. May 1946
 Wiesbaden, Germany, 11 June 1946 – 3 October 1947
 Smoky Hill Air Force Base, Kansas, 1 June 1948
 [[Lowry Air Force Base, Colorado, 4 June 1949
 Kansas City]], Missouri, 10 September 1951
 Grandview Air Force Base (later Richards-Gebaur Air Force Base), Missouri, 24 February 1954 – 8 July 1961
 Bagram Airfield, Afghanistan, by 2 October 2009 - c. 10 November 2014

Awards and Campaigns

References

Notes
 Explanatory notes

 Citations

Bibliography

External links
 
 Heraldry - 19th Expeditionary Weather Squadron

See also 
 List of United States Air Force weather squadrons

Weather 019